Wagadu soninke (Mauritania) The Soninke goddess, whose disappearance and rediscovery are the subject of the ancient Dausi epic.

References 

African mythology
African goddesses